Església de Sant Martí de Nagol  is a church located in Sant Julià de Lòria, Andorra. It is a heritage property registered in the Cultural Heritage of Andorra. It was built originally in the 11th century.

References

Sant Julià de Lòria
Roman Catholic churches in Andorra
Cultural Heritage of Andorra